Cruzo los dedos (I cross my fingers) is the fifth album from Spanish singer-songwriter Lucía Pérez, it was released on April 12, 2011. The first single released from the album "Que me quiten lo bailao" was released on 25 March 2011.

Singles
"Que me quiten lo bailao" was the first single released from the album, Lucía Pérez sang the song at the Eurovision Song Contest 2011 for Spain in the final. Pérez scored 50 points and finished 23rd.

Track listing

Charts

Release history

References 

2011 albums